Martín Vassallo Argüello chose to not defend his 2008 title.
Ramón Delgado won the tournament in his own country, after defeating Daniel Gimeno-Traver 7–6(2), 1–6, 6–3 in the final.

Seeds

Draw

Final four

Top half

Bottom half

References
 Main Draw
 Qualifying Draw

Copa Petrobras Asuncion - Singles
Copa Petrobras Asunción